Josef Parnas (born 1950) is a Danish psychiatrist. He is Professor of Psychiatry at the University of Copenhagen, as well as a co-founder and senior researcher at the Center for Subjectivity Research.

References

External links
Faculty page

1950 births
Living people
Danish psychiatrists
Academic staff of the University of Copenhagen